Hilderic (460s – 533) was the penultimate king of the Vandals and Alans in North Africa in Late Antiquity (523–530). Although dead by the time the Vandal Kingdom was overthrown in 534, he nevertheless played a key role in that event.

Life 
Hilderic was the grandson of king Genseric, founder of the Vandal kingdom in Africa. His father was Genseric's son Huneric, and his mother was Eudocia, the daughter of the Roman Emperor Valentinian III and Licinia Eudoxia. Most of the Vandals were Arians and had persecuted Chalcedonians, but Hilderic favored Chalcedonianism as the religion of his mother, making his accession to the throne controversial. Soon after becoming king, Hilderic had his predecessor's widow, Amalafrida, imprisoned; he escaped war with her brother, the Gothic king Theoderic the Great, only by virtue of the latter's death in 526.

Hilderic's reign was noteworthy for the kingdom's excellent relations with the Eastern Roman Empire. Procopius writes that he was "a very particular friend and guest-friend of Justinian, who had not yet come to the throne", noting that Hilderic and Justinian exchanged large presents of money to each other. Hilderic allowed a new Chalcedonian bishop to take office in the Vandal capital of Carthage, and many Vandals began to convert to Chalcedonianism, to the alarm of the Vandal nobility.

By the time he assumed the crown, Hilderic was at least into his fifties, if not more than 60. For this reason, according to Procopius, he was uninterested in the military operations of the Vandals and left them to other family members, of whom Procopius singles out for mention his nephew Hoamer.

After seven years on the throne, Hilderic fell victim to a revolt led by his cousin Gelimer, who led the people in a rebellion against the Vandal King. Gelimer then became King of the Vandals and Alans, and restored Arianism as the official religion of the kingdom. He imprisoned Hilderic, along with Hoamer and his brother Euagees, but did not kill him. Justinian protested Gelimer's actions, demanding that Gelimer return the kingdom to Hilderic. Gelimer sent away the envoys who brought him this message, blinding Hoamer and putting both Hilderic and Euagees under closer confinement, claiming that they had planned a coup against him. When Justinian sent a second embassy protesting these developments, Gelimer replied, in effect, that Justinian had no authority to make these demands. Angered at this response, Justinian quickly concluded his ongoing war with the Sassanian Empire and prepared an expedition against the Vandals in 533. Once Gelimer learned of the arrival of the Roman army, he had Hilderic murdered, along with Euagees and other supporters of Hilderic he had imprisoned.

References

460s births
533 deaths
Kings of the Vandals
Christian monarchs
5th-century Christians
6th-century Christians
6th-century monarchs in Africa
People of Roman descent
6th-century murdered monarchs